Josette Desclercs Abondio or Josette Abondio (born 1949) is an Ivorian teacher, writer and playwright.

Early life and education
Josette Desclercs Abondio was born in 1949 in the Ivory Coast and her first language is French. She discovered books in her childhood and became an avid reader. Abondio worked as a secondary school teacher and trainer in technical expression.

Literary career 
In 1993, she wrote Kouassi Koko...ma mère, which is a novel about a concubine following the death of her patron.

Her next major work in 1999 was an illustrated book for children titled Le rêve de Kimi.

Abondio was the third president of the Writers Association of the Ivory Coast (AECI) from 1998 to 2000. In 2010, she was working with Flore Hazoumé on the magazine Scrib Spiritualité.

In 2013, she was running a bookshop in Abidjan.

Personal life 
Abondio is keen on the martial arts and is a black belt in karate.

Works
 
 
 
 
 Le royaume du cœur, 2013
, a collection of short stories in French.

References

1949 births
Living people
Ivorian women writers
Ivorian women children's writers